Kathryn D. Huff is an American engineer serving as the assistant secretary for the Office of Nuclear Energy. In January 2022, she was nominated to the position. She was confirmed by the Senate on May 5, 2022 by a 80-11 vote and sworn in on May 11, 2022.

Early life and education 
Huff attended high school in Bellville, Texas before graduating from the Texas Academy of Mathematics and Science. During high school, she also took mathematics and science courses at the University of North Texas. She earned a Bachelor of Arts degree in physics from the University of Chicago and a PhD in nuclear engineering from the University of Wisconsin–Madison. Huff has a twin sister.

Career 
In 2003 and 2004, Huff worked as a research assistant at the Los Alamos National Laboratory. She also worked as a research assistant at the University of Chile and Kavli Institute for Cosmology. In 2010, she was an intern at the Idaho National Laboratory, specializing in advanced nuclear energy systems integration. From 2011 to 2013, Huff was a graduate researcher at Argonne National Laboratory. After finishing her PhD, she was Postdoctoral Fellow at the Berkeley Institute for Data Science and the Nuclear Science and Security Consortium. Since 2016, Huff has worked as an assistant professor at the University of Illinois Urbana–Champaign. In May 2021, Huff was selected to serve as Principal Deputy Assistant Secretary and Acting Assistant Secretary for the Office of Nuclear Energy. In January 2022, Huff was nominated to serve as Assistant Secretary for Nuclear Energy, for the Department of Energy, and she was confirmed in May of the same year.

References 

Living people
American engineers
American nuclear engineers
People from Bellville, Texas
University of Chicago alumni
University of Wisconsin–Madison alumni
Los Alamos National Laboratory personnel
University of Illinois Urbana-Champaign faculty
United States Department of Energy officials
Year of birth missing (living people)
Biden administration personnel
American twins